Sclerotium cinnamomi is a plant pathogen infecting peanuts.

References

External links 
 USDA ARS Fungal Database

Fungal plant pathogens and diseases
Food plant pathogens and diseases
Typhulaceae